Eocasea is an extinct genus of caseid synapsids from the Late Pennsylvanian of Kansas. It is known from a single type species, Eocasea martini.

Description

 

Eocasea is the oldest and most basal member of Caseidae, lacking many of the specialized anatomical features that characterize later members of the group. Caseids are notable for being one of the first groups of tetrapods to evolve herbivory; large-bodied taxa such as Casea and Cotylorhynchus have barrel-shaped rib cages and leaf-shaped, serrated teeth that are clear adaptations for breaking down plant cellulose. Eocasea differs from these taxa in having a narrow rib cage, simple cone-shaped teeth, and a much smaller body size. All of these are plesiomorphic features for synapsids, meaning that Eocasea inherited a carnivorous lifestyle from similarly small-bodied carnivorous ancestors of synapsids. As the earliest known caseid, Eocasea represents one of the first transitions from carnivory to herbivory in tetrapods.

References

Caseasaurs
Prehistoric synapsid genera
Carboniferous synapsids of North America
Fossil taxa described in 2014
Carboniferous synapsids
Paleontology in Kansas